Giulio Coralli (born 1641) was an Italian painter of the Baroque period, active in Emilia-Romagna. He was a pupil first of Guercino, and then in Milan of Francesco Cairo. He was known for his portraits.

References

1641 births
Year of death unknown
17th-century Italian painters
Italian male painters
Painters from Bologna